The Dermateaceae is a family of cup fungi in the order Helotiales. Most species in this family are plant pathogens but some are saprobes.

Genera

This is a list of genera in the family, based on the 2007 Outline of Ascomycota.

Aivenia —
Angelina —
Anthopsis —
Ascluella —
Atropellis —
Belonopsis —
Blumeriella —
Calloria —
Calloriella —
Cashiella —
Cejpia —
Chaetonaevia —
Chlorosplenium —
Coleosperma —
Coronellaria —
Crustomollisia —
Cryptohymenium —
Dennisiodiscus —
Dermateopsis —
Dermea —
Dibeloniella —
Diplocarpa —
Diplocarpon —
Diplonaevia —
Discocurtisia —
Discohainesia —
Drepanopeziza —
Duebenia —
Durandiella —
Eupropolella —
Felisbertia —
Graddonia —
Haglundia —
Hysteronaevia —
Hysteropezizella —
Hysterostegiella —
Involucroscypha —
Laetinaevia —
Leptotrochila —
Marssonina  —
Micropeziza —
Mollisia —
Naevala —
Naeviella —
Naeviopsis —
Neofabraea —
Neotapesia —
Niptera —
Nothophacidium —
Obscurodiscus —
Obtectodiscus —
Patellariopsis —
Patinella —
Pezicula —
Pezolepis —
Phaeonaevia —
Pirottaea —
Pleoscutula —
Ploettnera —
Podophacidium —
Pseudonaevia —
Pseudoniptera —
Pseudopeziza —
Pyrenopeziza —
Sarconiptera —
Schizothyrioma —
Scleropezicula —
Scutobelonium —
Scutomollisia —
Sorokina —
Sorokinella —
Spilopodia —
Spilopodiella —
Trochila —
Tuberculariella —
Waltonia

References

 
Helotiales
Leotiomycetes genera